Društvo nogometna šola Prevalje or simply DNŠ Prevalje is a Slovenian football club which plays in the town of Prevalje. The club was established in 2002 after the dissolution of NK Korotan Prevalje, a club which folded during the 2002–03 Slovenian PrvaLiga season due to high financial debt. Legally, the two clubs' track records and honours are kept separate by the Football Association of Slovenia.

Honours
Slovenian Fourth Division
 Winners: 2015–16

Slovenian Fifth Division
 Winners: 2013–14

Slovenian Sixth Division
 Winners: 2007–08

MNZ Maribor Cup
 Winners: 2016–17, 2017–18

References

External links
Official website 

Association football clubs established in 2002
Prevalje
2002 establishments in Slovenia